Rein Abbey can refer to:

Rein Abbey, Norway 
Rein Abbey, Austria